Omalloor is a small town, about 3.5 km south of Pathanamthitta District headquarters, in Kerala. Omalloor is famous for Vayal Vanibham which is an annual farming fair held in the month of Meenam (October). People from both within and outside the town participate in the fair.

Demographics

Various sections of Christianity and Hinduism co-exist, the Nairs, Ezhavas, Viswakarmas Veerashaivas and the Scheduled Class & Tribes constitute the major sections of the Hindu religion. Major Christian sects are Orthodox church, Jacobite Church, Marthoma Church, Malankara Catholic Church, St. Thomas Evangelical Church, Church of South India, Pentecostal Churches, and Brethren.

Festivals

Temple festivals (Utsavam) and Church feasts (Palliperunal) are celebrated as village festivals. There are many historically important places of worship in Omalloor. The Rektha Kanda Swamy Temple is a grand temple situated in Omalloor,  which dates back to the 8th century AD, is famous for its 10-day annual festival (utsavam). It is also a main pilgrim center for Sabarimala pilgrims. The St. Thomas Orthodox Valiya Palli (church) is another major place of worship for Christians. Manjanikkara Dayara is famous for its pilgrimage importance. Every year thousands of pilgrims come by foot to the tomb of Holy Patriarch Ignatius Elias III at Manjanikkara. St. Peter's Jacobite church, St. Stephen's Jacobite Church, Mullanikkadu St.Marys Orthodox Valiyapally,  Puthenpeedika North St.Marys Orthodox Church,  Puthenpeedika St.Marys Orthodox Valiyapally, St. Thomas Malankara Catholic Church, Puthenpeedika, St. Peter's Malankara Catholic Church, Cheekanal and St. Thomas Mar Thoma Church, Cheekanal are some other important places worship at Omalloor. Mathoor Kaavu Bhagavathi Temple, situated on the banks of Achenkovil river, is a famous Hindu temple. The River Achankovil marks the eastern border of the Omalloor Panchayat. The Thazhoor Bhagavati Temple, famous for the annual Padayani rituals during the Malayalam month of Kumbham is located on the banks of the River Achankovil.

Schools
There are quite a few education institutions as Omallur is very close to Pathanamthitta town. These include Amrita Vidyalayam, Catholicate Higher Secondary School,  Bhavan's Vidya Mandir and Arya Bharati High School. Aarsha Bharatha Vidyalaya is a prominent school in Omallur with classes from pre-KG to 7th grade. Government Higher Secondary School Omallur founded in 1805, offer education till grade 12.

Madona International School, Puthenpeedika is another elegant institution at Omalloor.

Demographics
As per the 2011 Census of India, Omalloor had a population of 17611 with 8189 males and 9412 females.

Like many other communities in central Kerala, Omallur has a relatively high proportion of working age adults. Non-resident Indians (NRIs) amount to 35% of cash flow . 
There are a number of small family-owned retail shops, and rubber plantations etc.

Noted Personalities

Father V. C. Samuel - President World Council of Churches (Omalloor Valya Pally) 
Omalloor Chellamma - Malayalam drama and cine actress of 1950s. See Premalekha
Omalloor Prathapachandran - Malayalam film actor
 Late HG.Daniel Mar Philixenox - Former thumpamon diocese Metropolitan (Omalloor Valya Pally- Vaduthala Family)
Captain Raju - Malayalam film actor

See also

 Pathanamthitta District
 Vazhamuttom
 Thazhoor Bhagavathy Kshetram
 Vallicode
 Thumpamon

References

Villages in Pathanamthitta district